Dracula vs. Frankenstein is a 1971 American science fiction horror film directed and co-produced by Al Adamson. The film stars J. Carrol Naish as Dr. Durea, a descendant of Dr. Frankenstein who is working on a blood serum for his assistant Groton (Lon Chaney Jr.). The serum soon becomes sought after by Count Dracula (Zandor Vorkov), who hopes that it will grant him the ability to be exposed to sunlight without harm. Other members of the film's cast include Anthony Eisley, Regina Carrol, and Angelo Rossitto.

Plot
Mad scientist Dr. Durea, the last descendant of the original Dr. Frankenstein, takes to murdering young girls for experimentation in hopes of perfecting a blood serum of his own creation with help from his mute, simple-minded assistant Groton. Durea hopes the serum will heal his paralyzed legs and cure Groton of his condition. Count Dracula comes to the scientist, promising to help him revive the Frankenstein Monster (which he has exhumed from its secret grave in nearby Oakmoor Cemetery) in return for Durea's serum, which he hopes will grant him the ability to go out in the sunlight, thus making him invincible.

As a cover, the duo works out of a secret laboratory hidden behind the Creature Emporium, a haunted house exhibit and a throwback to the old sideshow days located on the boardwalk amusement park in Venice, California. They bring the Monster back to life, and Durea sends him and Dracula out to exact revenge on the man who both discredited him and crippled him in a laboratory fire, Dr. Beaumont. Las Vegas showgirl Judith Fontaine has also previously arrived, looking for her missing sister Joanie who was last seen hanging out with a group of hippies led by Strange. Judith has gotten no satisfaction from Sgt. Martin. She says she is going to investigate on her own and does so, attracting the attention of biker Rico and his gang. Rico slips her some LSD at a dive bar with the bartender's help and Judith, while on a trip due to the drug, is taken by Strange and his girlfriend Samantha, who have just finished attending a protest, to the home of aging fellow hippie Mike Howard who agrees to help her find Joanie. Judith, Mike, Samantha, and Strange go to the Creature Emporium (which Joanie had been known to go to many times), and Judith shows Durea a picture of Joanie, asking her if he has seen her, but he says that he has not.

More girls turn up missing. The Monster kills a couple of police officers while trying to abduct a girl for Durea's experiments. Groton goes to the beach with an axe and kills Rico and his gang before they could rape Samantha, then Groton takes her into Durea's laboratory through a trap door with a ladder that leads to the beach below the Creature Emporium. Judith and Mike go to the Emporium, discover the trap door and the laboratory and confront Durea. He explains that the girls who were killed (including Joanie, whom Judith finds preserved naked, unmoving, and seemingly neither dead nor alive, in a glass-fronted box in the laboratory, along with Samantha, who is in another identical box, in a similar state) were frightened before their deaths. This created a special enzyme in their blood, which is the main ingredient for his blood serum. He also tells Judith that, after he has Mike (with whom she has fallen in love and he with her) killed, her fear upon seeing Mike's death will help him complete the serum at last. Durea sends Groton and a dwarf named Grazbo, the ticket taker at the Creature Emporium, after the couple. Grazbo falls through the laboratory's trap door to the beach and onto an ax that he had dropped beforehand while holding on to the ladder, which kills him, and Groton goes after Judith. Sgt. Martin and Strange arrive with the police, and Martin shoots Groton from the rooftop of the building from which he falls to his death, while Durea falls from his wheelchair into a guillotine display in the Emporium while attempting to escape and is beheaded in it.

Dracula meets Judith, hypnotizes her, and binds her with rope to a railing. He then confronts Mike, who shoves a lit car flare in the Monster's face, forcing him to briefly turn on Dracula in his pain. Mike unties Judith, and they run away, but as they do so, Dracula blasts Mike with fire shot out from his one-eyed demon-headed ring, burning him to ashes.

Judith faints upon seeing Mike's death and slowly awakens to find herself bound with rope again to a chair in an abandoned and desecrated church in a forest area outside of Venice where Dracula's coffin is hidden. Dracula is about to drink her blood and turn her into his vampire bride, but the Monster, who has fallen for her beauty, turns against Dracula. The Monster forces Dracula out of the church and into the surrounding forest (but not before removing Dracula's ring from his finger), where a fierce battle ensues between the two monsters. Dracula tears off the Monster's arms and head, but gets caught in the sun's rays before he can make it back to his coffin and disintegrates into dust. Judith manages to free herself and sees Dracula's ashes and clothing. She then picks up Dracula's ring at the church's door but, after a brief flashback of all that has happened to her before, drops it and flees in fear.

Cast

Production

The film was developed under the title Blood Freaks - The Blood Suckers. Paul Lukus was initially set to play the role that eventually went to J. Carrol Naish.

To accommodate the actor's schedules, shooting began before production elements were in place. Director Al Adamson had actors Lon Chaney Jr. and Naish sight unseen. It was the last film by both actors. When asked on Chaney's state during the film, Sam Sherman stated Denver Dixon that Chaney had to lie down between takes and kept saying to Dixon "You and I are the only two left... They're all gone... I want to die now. There's nothing left for me; I just want to die." Russ Tamblyn echoed these statements, saying Chaney was drunk he felt really sad for him at the time. Anthony Eisley also stated that Chaney had to lie down between takes and that he spoke with a whisper leading to making the character mute. 

After completing a rough cut of the film, production supervisor Sam Sherman felt the film lacked punch and added Dracula and Frankenstein's monster into the film while a motorcycle angle was downplayed.

Reception
Lon Chaney, Jr. biographer Don G. Smith stated that the film was "replete with problems" with Regina Carrol giving the worst performance of her career, and that the lighting of the final monster scene was indadequate. Smith declared Zandor Vorkov as "one of the worst Draculas in screen history"

Home media
The film was first released on DVD by Troma Entertainment,

See also
 List of American films of 1971

Notes

Sources

External links

 
 

1971 films
1971 independent films
1971 horror films
1970s exploitation films
1970s monster movies
1970s science fiction horror films
American exploitation films
American independent films
American monster movies
American science fiction horror films
American vampire films
Dracula films
Frankenstein films
Horror crossover films
Films directed by Al Adamson
Films scored by William Lava
Films set in Los Angeles
Films shot in Los Angeles
Films shot in Los Angeles County, California
Films shot in New York (state)
Films shot in the Las Vegas Valley
1970s English-language films
1970s American films